The 2007 Bulgarian Cup Final was the final match of the 2006–07 edition of the Bulgarian Cup competition. It was the 67th consecutive Bulgarian Cup final match. The defending cup holders CSKA Sofia were eliminated at the quarter-final stage by Beroe Stara Zagora.

The match was held on 24 May 2007 at the Stadion Beroe in Stara Zagora, Bulgaria. Despite the good performance by Litex, they lost the match in the extra time when the referee award a penalty for Levski which was scored by Cédric Bardon. The win gave Levski their 25th Bulgarian Cup success.

Match

Details

See also
2006–07 A Group

References

Bulgarian Cup finals
PFC Levski Sofia matches
PFC Litex Lovech matches
Cup Final